Sulejman Krpić (born 1 January 1991) is a Bosnian professional footballer who plays as a striker for Bosnian Premier League club Željezničar.

He also played for the Bosnia and Herzegovina national team.

Club career

Early career
Born in Brčko, SR Bosnia and Herzegovina, back then still within SFR Yugoslavia, Krpić played with the youth team of Orašje where he became noticed for being the top scorer in the team and scoring in the Bosnian Youth Cup final against Bosna Visoko which Orašje won by 4–1. He joined the Dinamo Zagreb youth team in 2008. In April 2009, while he was 18 years old, he signed a 10-year contract with Dinamo. He stayed with the Croatian giants for two years, playing in their youth and reserves teams. In 2010, he moved to Austria joining LASK  juniors team competing in the 2010–11 Austrian Regional League Central, better known as Regionalliga, Austrian third level.

In the summer of 2011, Krpić returned to Bosnia and Herzegovina, and after a half-season with Orašje, he signed a one-year contract with Sarajevo the during winter-break, and debuted in the second half of the 2011–12 league season. A year later, Krpić left Sarajevo and moved to neighbor Serbia where he played in the second level, Serbian First League, with Metalac Gornji Milanovac.

Sloboda Tuzla
At the end of the 2012–13 season, Krpić left Metalac and joined Sloboda Tuzla, then playing in the second level but clearly aiming to return to the top level. Sloboda had brought coach Miroslav Blažević whose first signings were Edin Husić and Krpić. They achieved promotion that year by winning the 2013–14 First League of FBiH.

Krpić stayed with Sloboda the following seasons, being a member of the squad for the 2015–16 season , just two years after their promotion, when they finished second in the league and were cup finalists. At the start of that season, Krpić left Sloboda and signed a three-year contract with Croatian top-flight side Istra 1961, however, he left Istra shortly afterward, without even debuting for them in any competition, and during the following winter-break he rejoined Sloboda.

Halfway through the 2016–17 season, Krpić led the scoring table in the Bosnian Premier League, subsequently attracting interest from abroad. On 3 March 2017, it was announced that he had signed a three-year contract with Swedish first-tier side AIK, a fee rumoured to be €150,000, upon recommendation from the club's assistant manager Nebojša Novaković. He left the club the same year and came back to Sloboda. After one season in Sloboda, Krpić left and joined Iranian club Tractor.

Željezničar
At the end of the season, Krpić left Tractor, came back to Bosnia and Herzegovina and signed a two-year contract with Željezničar. In the 2018–19 season, he finished as the league top goalscorer, scoring 16 goals in 32 league games for Željezničar.

Krpić scored two goals in Željezničar's 5–2 Sarajevo derby win against his former club FK Sarajevo on 31 August 2019. On 30 November 2019, he scored another goal against Sarajevo in the city derby, this time in Željezničar's 3–1 away league win.

Later career
On 3 January 2020, Krpić signed a contract with South Korean K League 1 club Suwon Samsung Bluewings for a €230.000 transfer fee. He made his official debut on 19 February 2020, in an AFC Champions League match against Vissel Kobe. He left Suwon on 7 November 2020 after his contract with the club expired.

Krpić joined Romanian Liga I club Astra Giurgiu in December 2020. He made his debut in a league game against Argeș Pitești on 6 February 2021. He scored his first goal for Astra against Academica Clinceni in a league game on 27 February 2021.

On 28 June 2021, Krpić signed a three-year contract with Tuzla City. He debuted and scored his first goal for Tuzla City on 19 July 2021, in a league game against Sarajevo. Following Tuzla City, he played for Australian side Western Sydney Wanderers.

Return to Željezničar
Krpić returned to Željezničar in February 2023, signing a two-year deal. He made his second debut for Željezničar in a Bosnian Cup game against Leotar on 18 February. Krpić scored his first goal for the club since returning on 25 February, in a league game against Igman Konjic.

International career
Krpić was part of the Bosnia and Herzegovina U19 national team in 2009 and 2011. He made 4 appearances for the national team but did not score a goal.

In December 2021, Krpić received his first senior call-up, for a friendly game against the United States, and debuted in that game on 18 December.

Career statistics

Club

International

Honours
Sloboda Tuzla 
First League of FBiH: 2013–14
Bosnian Premier League runner up: 2015–16
Bosnian Cup runner up: 2015–16

Individual
Bosnian Premier League Top Goalscorer: 2018–19 (16 goals)

References

External links
Sulejman Krpić at Sofascore

1991 births
Living people
People from Brčko District
Association football forwards
Bosnia and Herzegovina footballers
Bosnia and Herzegovina youth international footballers
Bosnia and Herzegovina international footballers
LASK players
HNK Orašje players
FK Sarajevo players
FK Metalac Gornji Milanovac players
FK Sloboda Tuzla players
AIK Fotboll players
Tractor S.C. players
FK Željezničar Sarajevo players
Suwon Samsung Bluewings players
FC Astra Giurgiu players
FK Tuzla City players
Western Sydney Wanderers FC players
Austrian Regionalliga players
First League of the Federation of Bosnia and Herzegovina players
Premier League of Bosnia and Herzegovina players
Serbian First League players
Allsvenskan players
Persian Gulf Pro League players
K League 1 players
Liga I players
A-League Men players
Expatriate footballers in Croatia
Bosnia and Herzegovina expatriate footballers
Expatriate footballers in Austria
Bosnia and Herzegovina expatriate sportspeople in Austria
Expatriate footballers in Serbia
Bosnia and Herzegovina expatriate sportspeople in Serbia
Expatriate footballers in Sweden
Bosnia and Herzegovina expatriate sportspeople in Sweden
Expatriate footballers in Iran
Bosnia and Herzegovina expatriate sportspeople in Iran
Expatriate footballers in South Korea
Bosnia and Herzegovina expatriate sportspeople in South Korea
Expatriate footballers in Romania
Bosnia and Herzegovina expatriate sportspeople in Romania
Expatriate soccer players in Australia
Bosnia and Herzegovina expatriate sportspeople in Australia